Charles Edward Kassel (November 20, 1903 – November 30, 1977) was a professional American football player who played as an end in the National Football League (NFL) for seven seasons with the Chicago Bears, the Frankford Yellow Jackets, and the Chicago Cardinals. Before his professional career, he was a star player for Proviso Township High School in Maywood, Illinois, a suburb west of Chicago. After his football career, he taught physical education and coached at Proviso for several decades.

References

1903 births
1977 deaths
American football ends
Chicago Bears players
Chicago Cardinals players
Frankford Yellow Jackets players
Illinois Fighting Illini football players
Sportspeople from Maywood, Illinois
Players of American football from Chicago